Samuel Seamans (born 1967) was an assisting bishop in the Diocese of Mid-America of the Reformed Episcopal Church and the Anglican Church in North America's College of Bishops until he and his parish decided to join the Orthodox Church in November 2015. This community ultimately joined the Ukrainian Orthodox Church USA. He is also rector of St. Thomas the Apostle Orthodox Church in Mountain Home, Arkansas and as well a licensed pilot and Emergency Medical Technician.

Ministry

During college Seamans was employed as a police officer and completed the police academy in 1987. After graduation he moved to Mountain Home, Arkansas, and went to work with the Mountain Home Police department where he eventually served as a lieutenant before retiring in 2011.
Seamans states he felt a growing desire to fulfill a vacuum in his spiritual life and in 1997 he began to study church history and liturgy. Then, he states, he found a historical, ancient expression of Christianity in the Anglican tradition. In November 2015 he became Orthodox.

History

Seamans then continued to serve under Arkansas Episcopal bishop Larry Maze, but left the Episcopal Church three years later because of its social and theological liberalism, as well as what he describes as "its departure from the norms that Holy Scripture lays out for the Christian life and ministry".

Episcopal priest controversy

In November 2009, Seamans gained international notice by exposing an All Saints Day liturgy used by an Episcopal priest in Harrison, Arkansas. The liturgy "Praises Mohammed, Vishnu, Buddha, Confucius ..." with the celebrant stating: "All you Hindu saints; we praise you for holy are you ... All you Buddhist saints, we praise you for holy are you ..." even calling on "All you Incas of Peru, holy Mayans and Aztecs of Mexico, all you Native children of the sun and stars ..."

The Episcopal Bishop of Arkansas (TEC) supported the liturgy under the guise of "inter-faith dialogue".

Education

Seamans holds a bachelor's degree from the University of Southwestern Louisiana in Liberal Arts, Master of Ministry Degree from Trinity Theological Seminary in Newburgh, Indiana, Th.M (Masters in Theology) from Cranmer Theological House (REC), and a Graduate Certificate from the Anglican School for Ministry in Anglican Studies, in addition to a Master of Divinity from Holy Resurrection Orthodox Seminary. He was ordained an Orthodox priest in the Russian Orthodox Church Outside of Russia in February 2017.

Seamans is conversant in Czech, is a licensed pilot for single engine aircraft, and is a certified emergency medical technician. He is also a long distance cyclist and is very proud of his "Giant FCR 1 Flatbar Road Bike". He says, "I get most of my praying done while riding. I find it a very contemplative exercise which easily gives itself to prayer and meditation."

Career and family life

Seamans is a retired lieutenant from MHPD  and now serves at the Arkansas State University Police Department in Mountain Home, Arkansas. He is married to a native of the Czech Republic and has two children.

Publications

 Introduction to Holy Communion and the Bible from the 1928 Book of Common Prayer, BorderStone Press, LLC (2010). Editor Brian R. Mooney.

References

21st-century Anglican bishops in the United States
1967 births
Living people
Baptists from Louisiana
Trinity College and Seminary alumni
People from Morgan City, Louisiana
People from Mountain Home, Arkansas
Baptists from Arkansas
Converts to Eastern Orthodoxy from Anglicanism